Craig Alexander may refer to:

Craig Alexander (cricketer) (born 1987), South African cricketer
Craig Alexander (triathlete) (born 1973), Australian Ironman and 70.3 world champion
Craig Alexander (arena football) from 1991 Dallas Texans season

See also